Hans Bruun Nielsen is mathematician and Associate Professor of Technical University of Denmark specializing in Numerical analysis and the application of numerical methods.

Book 

 Eldén, Wittmeyer-Koch, Nielsen Introduction to Numerical Computation - analysis and MATLAB illustrations, 2004 Studentlitteratur, 
 The book's Contents page
 Formulae from the book (E.g. order of Cholesky decomposition computations, maximum error in Chebyshev interpolation, and maximum stable step length using Runge-Kutta.)

External links
 The Hans Bruun Nielsen Informatics and Mathematical Modelling page
 Nielsen's DACE software download page Design and Analysis of Computer Experiments is a freely distributable MATLAB toolbox for Kriging approximations to computer models.
 immoptibox: matlab toolbox for optimization and data fitting
 More software by HBN

Year of birth missing (living people)
Living people
Danish mathematicians
Numerical analysts